Masquerade or Masquerades may refer to:

Books
 Masquerade (book), a 1979 children's book by Kit Williams that sparked a worldwide treasure hunt
 Masquerades (novel), a 1995 Forgotten Realms novel by Kate Novak and Jeff Grubb
 Masquerade, a 2007 Blue Bloods novel by Melissa de la Cruz

Theatre
 The Masquerade (play), a 1719 play by Charles Johnson
 Mascarade, a 1724 comedy play by Ludvig Holberg
 Masquerade (play), an 1835 Russian play by Mikhail Lermontov
 Masquerade (theatre group), an English theatre group in Chennai, India, since 1994

Films
 The Masquerade, a 1913 animated film by Émile Cohl
 Masquerade (1929 film), an American drama film
 Masquerade, a 1931 film starring Vivienne Osborne
 Masquerade (1941 film), a Soviet film
 Masquerade (1965 film), a British spy spoof starring Cliff Robertson and Jack Hawkins
 Masquerade (1988 film), an American thriller starring Rob Lowe and Meg Tilly
 The Masquerade, a 2007 American thriller starring Brianne Davis and Christopher Masterson
 Masquerades (film), a 2008 film
 Masquerade (2012 film), or Gwanghae, South Korean film
 Masquerade (2021 film), an American thriller

Television

Shows
 Masquerade (TV series), a 1983 American espionage series
 Masquerade (Bakugan Battle Brawlers), a masked character in the anime Bakugan Battle Brawlers
 Masquerade, the international title for Kasou Taishou, a Japanese semi-annual amateur skit show

Episodes
 "Masquerade" (Alias)
 "Masquerade" (Baywatch)
 "Masquerade" (Benson)
 "Masquerade" (The Bill)
 "Masquerade" (Dallas)
 "Masquerade" (Dynasty)
 "Masquerade" (ER)
 "Masquerade" (The Flash)
 "Masquerade" (The Fugitive)
 "Masquerade" (Iron Man: Armored Adventures)
 "Masquerade" (Law & Order: Criminal Intent)
 "Masquerade" (Law & Order: UK)
 "Masquerade" (NCIS)
 "Masquerade" (The Real Ghostbusters)
 "Masquerade" (Six Degrees)
 "Masquerade" (The Transformers)
 "Masquerade" (Trauma)
 "Masquerade" (Person of Interest)
 "Masquerade" (The Vampire Diaries)

Music
 The Masquerade (Atlanta), a concert venue in Atlanta, Georgia

Classical music
 Mascherata (English: Masquerade), an Italian dance from the sixteenth century
 Masquerade, lute piece by Robert de Visée (c. 1655 – 1732/1733)
 Masquerade (Khachaturian), incidental music by Aram Khachaturian
 Masquerade (Clyne), a 2013 orchestral composition by Anna Clyne

Bands
 Masquerade (Finnish band), a Finnish post-punk band
 Masquerade (German band), a band with Drafi Deutscher that had a hit in 1984 with the song "Guardian Angel"
 Masquerade (Swedish band), a Swedish rock band

Albums
 Masquerade (Eric Saade album), or the title song, 2010
 Masquerade (Golden Dawn album), 2003
 Masquerade (The Legendary Tigerman album), or the title song, 2006
 Masquerade (Running Wild album), 1995
 Masquerade (Wyclef Jean album), 2002
 Masquerade, an album by Dreams of Sanity, 1999
 The Masquerade (album), by mxmtoon, 2019
 The Masquerade, by Mêlée, 2010
 Masquerade, an album by Bananarama, or the title song, 2022

Songs
 "Masquerade" (2PM song), 2012
 "Masquerade" (Kaya song), 2006
 "Masquerade", by Ashley Tisdale from Guilty Pleasure, 2009
 "Masquerade", by Beach House from Once Twice Melody, 2022
 "Masquerade", by Berlin from Pleasure Victim, 1982
 "Masquerade", by Nicki Minaj from Pink Friday: Roman Reloaded, 2012
 "Masquerade", by Northlane from Singularity, 2013
 "Masquerade", from the musical The Phantom of the Opera, 1986

Other uses
 Masquerade (biology), a form of camouflage relying on mimicry of inanimate objects such as twigs
 Masquerade (trope), a fantasy and speculative fiction trope involving a hidden society within the real world
 Masquerade, a type of computer threat

See also
 Masquerade ball, a costumed dance event 
 Masquerade ceremony, a rite or cultural event in many parts of the world, especially the Caribbean and Africa
 Masquerade society, a fictional society in Vampire: The Masquerade
 Masquerader (disambiguation)
 IP masquerading, a form of network address translation
 Mask-A-Raid, a 1931 animated short film starring Betty Boop
 Mascarade, a card game
 Maskarade, a 1906 opera by Carl Nielsen, based on the play by Ludvig Holberg
 Maskerade, a 1995 Discworld novel by Terry Pratchett